The 2010–11 Cosmopolitan Soccer League was the 87th season of the league's existence, as well as the sixteenth season of the league representing parts of the fifth through seventh tiers of the American Soccer Pyramid.

The defending champions are the Pancyprian-Freedoms for the First Division East. The defending First Division West champions are the Barnstonworth Rovers.

Standings

First Division

First Division Reserves

Second Division

Second Division Reserves

Metro 1 Division

Metro 2 Division

Over 30 Division 

Cosmopolitan Soccer League